The non-marine molluscs of the republic of Trinidad and Tobago (which comprises two West Indian islands) are a part of the molluscan fauna of Trinidad and Tobago, part of the Natural history of Trinidad and Tobago.

Starting in the 1860s, the terrestrial and freshwater molluscs of Trinidad and Tobago have been fairly well studied. Thomas Bland published the first paper mentioning terrestrial molluscs in 1861. Robert John Lechmere Guppy discovered and identified many more species from 1864 onwards, and along with Edgar Albert Smith was responsible for the earliest comprehensive species lists. The list here includes all the non-marine mollusks found in Trinidad and Tobago`s ecosystem including native, introduced and invasive species alike.

Freshwater gastropods

Freshwater gastropods include:

Ampullariidae
 Marisa cornuarietis (Linnaeus, 1758)
 Pomacea glauca (Linné, 1758)
 Pomacea urceus (Müller, 1774)

Ancylidae
 Hebetancylus excentricus (Morelet, 1851)

Hydrobiidae
 Pyrgophorus parvulus (Guilding, 1828)

Physidae
 Physella cubensis (Pfeiffer, 1839)

Planorbidae
 Tropicorbis pallidus (C.B. Adams, 1846)

Thiaridae
 Melanoides tuberculata (O. F. Müller, 1774)

Land gastropods
Land gastropods include:

Helicinidae
 Helicina nemoralis Guppy, 1866
 Helicina dysoni (L. Pfeiffer, 1849)
 Lucidella ignicoma (Guppy, 1868) Endemic to Trinidad
 Lucidella lirata (L. Pfeiffer, 1847)

Neocyclotidae
 Aperostoma translucidum trinitense (Guppy, 1864)
 Neocyclotus rugatus (Guppy, 1864)

Diplommatinidae

 Adelopoma occidentale (Guppy, 1872)

Annulariidae
 Halotudora aripensis (Guppy, 1864) Endemic to Trinidad

Truncatellidae
 Truncatella reclusa (Guppy, 1871) Endemic to Trinidad

Veronicellidae
 Diplosolenodea bielenbergi (Semper, 1885)
 Sarasinula plebeia (Fischer, 1868)

Achatinidae

 Lissachatina fulica (Bowdich, 1822) Invasive
 Allopeas gracile (Hutton, 1834)
 Allopeas micra (d’Orbigny, 1835)
 Beckianum beckianum (L. Pfeiffer, 1846)
 Leptopeas simplex (Guppy, 1868)
 Leptinaria unilamellata (d’Orbigny, 1835)
 Leptinaria urichi (E.A. Smith, 1896) Endemic to Trinidad
 Stenogyra octogyra (L. Pfeiffer, 1856)
 Subulina octona (Bruguière, 1798)

Ferussaciidae
 Karolus consobrinus (d’Orbigny, 1841)

Streptaxidae

 Gulella bicolor (Hutton, 1834) Introduced
 Streptartemon glaber (L. Pfeiffer, 1850)
 Streptostele musaecola (Morelet, 1860) Introduced

Succineidae
 Succinea sp.
 Omalonyx unguis (d'Orbigny, 1836)

Vertiginidae
 Bothriopupa conoidea (L. Pfeiffer, 1853)
 Bothriopupa tenuidens (C.B. Adams, 1845)
 Sterkia eyriesii (Drouet, 1859)

Gastrocoptidae
 Gastrocopta barbadensis (L. Pfeiffer, 1853)
 Gastrocopta iheringi (Suter, 1900)
 Gastrocopta pellucida (L. Pfeiffer, 1840)
 Gastrocopta servilis riisei (L. Pfeiffer, 1852)
 Gastrocopta rupicola marginalba (L. Pfeiffer, 1840)
 Gastrocopta geminidens (Pilsbry, 1917)

Valloniidae
 Pupisoma dioscoricola (C. B. Adams, 1845)

Amphibulimidae
 Plekocheilus glaber (Gmelin, 1791)

Bulimulidae
 Bulimulus sp.
 Drymaeus aureolus (Guppy, 1866) Endemic to Trinidad
 Drymaeus broadwayi (E.A. Smith, 1896) Endemic to Trinidad
 Drymaeus imperfectus (Guppy, 1866) Endemic to Trinidad
 Drymaeus mossi (E.A. Smith, 1896) Endemic to Trinidad
 Drymaeus rawsoni (Guppy, 1871) Endemic to Tobago
 Drymaeus vincentinus (L. Pfeiffer, 1846)
 Protoglyptus pilosus (Guppy, 1871)

Orthalicidae

 Orthalicus undatus (Bruguière, 1792)

Simpulopsidae
 Simpulopsis corrugata Guppy, 1866

Urocoptidae
 Brachypodella trinitaria (L. Pfeiffer, 1860)
 Brachypodella oropuchensis Spence (Possible synonym of above)

Scolodontidae
 Happia guildingi (Bland, 1865)
 Miradiscops implicans (Guppy, 1868)
 Miradiscops lunti (E.A. Smith, 1898)
 Systrophia alicea (Guppy, 1871)
 Tamayoa decolorata (Drouët, 1859) 
 Tamayoa trinitaria (E.A. Smith, 1898)

Gastrodontidae

 Pseudohyalina umbratilis (Guppy, 1868)

Philomycidae
 Pallifera sp.

Euconulidae
 Guppya gundlachi (L. Pfeiffer, 1840)
 Habroconus ernsti (Jousseaume, 1889)
 Habroconus cassiquiensis (L. Pfeiffer, 1853)

Helicarionidae
 Ovachlamys fulgens (Gude, 1900) Introduced

Strophocheilidae
 Megalobulimus oblongus (Müller, 1774)
 Megalobulimus oblongus var. tobagoensis (Pilsbry, 1895)

Charopidae
 Radioconus bactricola (Guppy, 1868)
 Radiodiscus hollidayi Rutherford, 2020

Trichodisccinidae
 Trichodiscina coactiliata (Férussac, 1838)

Thysanophoridae
 Lyroconus plagioptycha (Shuttleworth, 1854)

Freshwater bivalves
Freshwater bivalves include:

Mycetopodidae
 Anodontites leotaudi (Guppy, 1864)
 Mycetopoda siliquosa (Spix, 1827)

Sphaeriidae (=Pisidiidae)
 Pisidium punctiferum (Guppy, 1867)
 Eupera cubensis (Prime, 1865)

See also

Lists of non-marine molluscs of nearby countries and islands:
 List of non-marine molluscs of Venezuela
 List of non-marine molluscs of Grenada
 List of non-marine molluscs of Barbados
 List of non-marine molluscs of Curaçao
 List of non-marine molluscs of Aruba
 List of non-marine molluscs of Guyana

References

Molluscs, Non-marine
Trinidad
Moll
Trinidad
Trinidad and Tobago
Trinidad